Trust Bank Building is a skyscraper in the Central Business District of Johannesburg, South Africa. It was built in 1970 to a height of 140 metres. The building is the former head office of Trust Bank of South Africa, and as such has one of the largest bank vaults in South Africa. The building was sold in February 2003 for Rand 6.4 million (USD $640,000).
Like most skyscrapers in Johannesburg the height is 140m which is the same height as KwaDukuza eGoli Hotel, Michelangelo Towers, ABSA Tower and 
Standard Bank Centre which are all 140m tall.

See also
 Carlton Centre
 Ponte City Apartments
 Hillbrow Tower
 Standard Bank Centre
List of tallest buildings in South Africa 
List of tallest buildings in Africa

External links 

 Emporis
 SkyscraperPage

Skyscraper office buildings in Johannesburg
Office buildings completed in 1970
20th-century architecture in South Africa